

254001–254100 

|-bgcolor=#f2f2f2
| colspan=4 align=center | 
|}

254101–254200 

|-bgcolor=#f2f2f2
| colspan=4 align=center | 
|}

254201–254300 

|-id=299
| 254299 Shambleau ||  || "Shambleau" (1933) is a short story by the American writer C. L. Moore (1911–1987). || 
|}

254301–254400 

|-bgcolor=#f2f2f2
| colspan=4 align=center | 
|}

254401–254500 

|-id=422
| 254422 Henrykent ||  || Henry Kent, a Canadian inventor with a passion and curiosity for science and engineering, who worked at the Ontario Science Centre || 
|}

254501–254600 

|-bgcolor=#f2f2f2
| colspan=4 align=center | 
|}

254601–254700 

|-bgcolor=#f2f2f2
| colspan=4 align=center | 
|}

254701–254800 

|-id=749
| 254749 Kurosawa ||  || Akira Kurosawa (1910–1998), a Japanese film director, producer, screenwriter and editor || 
|}

254801–254900 

|-id=846
| 254846 Csontváry ||  || Tivadar Kosztka Csontváry (1853–1919), a Hungarian painter || 
|-id=863
| 254863 Robinwarren ||  || Robin Warren (born 1937), an Australian pathologist and Nobel Laureate || 
|-id=876
| 254876 Strommer ||  || Gyula Strommer (1920–1995), a Hungarian mechanical engineer and mathematician, professor of the Budapest University of Technology, and discoverer of minor planets || 
|}

254901–255000 

|-bgcolor=#f2f2f2
| colspan=4 align=center | 
|}

References 

254001-255000